Zadneye Pole is a rural locality (a village) in Nagornoye Rural Settlement, Petushinsky District, Vladimir Oblast, Russia. The population was 29 as of 2010. There are 6 streets.

Geography 
Zadneye Pole is located 32 km west of Petushki (the district's administrative centre) by road. Kirzhach is the nearest rural locality.

References 

Rural localities in Petushinsky District